The 1937 Denver Pioneers football team was an American football team that represented the University of Denver as a member of the Rocky Mountain Conference (RMC) during the 1937 college football season. In their second season under head coach Bill Saunders, the Pioneers compiled a 6–3 record (5–2 against conference opponents, tied for third in the RMC, and outscored opponents by a total of 122 to 61.

Schedule

References

Denver
Denver Pioneers football seasons
Denver Pioneers football